Zygmunt Florenty Wróblewski (28 October 1845 – 16 April 1888) was a Polish physicist and chemist.

Biography
Wróblewski was born in Grodno (Russian Empire, now in Belarus). He studied at Kiev University. After a six-year exile for participating in the January 1863 Uprising against Imperial Russia, he studied in Berlin and Heidelberg.  He defended his doctoral dissertation at Munich University in 1876 and became an assistant professor at Strasburg University. In 1880 he became a member of the Polish Academy of Learning.

Wróblewski was introduced to gas condensation in Paris by Professor Caillet at the École Normale Supérieure.  When Wróblewski was offered a chair in physics at Jagiellonian University, he accepted it. At Kraków he began studying gases and soon established a collaboration with Karol Olszewski.

While studying carbonic acid, Wróblewski discovered the CO2 hydrate. He reported this finding in 1882.

On 29 March 1883 Wróblewski and Olszewski used a new method of condensing oxygen, and on 13 April the same year—nitrogen.

Karol Olszewski continued the experiments, using an improved Pictet cascade apparatus, and carbon dioxide, boiling ethylene in vacuum, and boiling nitrogen and boiling air as cooling agents.

He died on 16 April 1888. While studying the physical properties of hydrogen, Wróblewski upset a kerosene lamp and was severely burned. He died soon after at a Kraków hospital and was buried at the Rakowicki Cemetery in Kraków.

In 1976, the International Astronomical Union (IAU) passed a decision to give the name of Wróblewski to one of the craters of the Moon in honour of the chemist.

Books
  (On the Diffusion of Gases through Absorbing Substances, 1874)

See also

 House of Wróblewski (Lubicz)
 Timeline of low-temperature technology
 Timeline of hydrogen technologies
 List of Poles

Notes 

1845 births
1888 deaths
Heidelberg University alumni
Ludwig Maximilian University of Munich alumni
Zygmunt
Academic staff of Jagiellonian University
People from Grodno
19th-century Polish chemists
19th-century Polish physicists
January Uprising participants
Accidental deaths in Poland
Polish exiles in the Russian Empire